Seed of the woman or offspring of the woman is a phrase from the Book of Genesis: as a result of the serpent's temptation of Eve, which resulted in the fall of man, God announces (in Genesis 3:15) that he will put an enmity between the seed of the serpent and the seed of the woman.  In Christianity, this verse is known as the protoevangelium, and is interpreted as a prophecy of the coming of Jesus. In Judaism, the "seed of the woman" is taken as a collective reference to mankind in general.

Source text 
In Genesis 3, Eve is tempted by a serpent to disobey God's orders and eat from the tree of the knowledge of good and evil. When confronted by God, she blames the serpent for her actions. God therefore curses the serpent to crawl on its belly and eat dust, and adds:

There are several different ways of translating this verse. The Latin Vulgate, which is generally used as a source text for Catholic bibles, has feminine rather than masculine pronouns in the latter half of the verse. Additionally, the second occurrence of the Hebrew shuph (שׁוּף), "bruise", is translated in the Vulgate as insidiaberis, "lie in wait". Consequently, Catholic bibles often give a reading such as that found in the Douay–Rheims Bible: "... she shall crush thy head, and thou shalt lie in wait for her heel".

The first shuph may also be translated as "crush" ("he shall crush thy head"). Authors such as  H. C. Leupold have argued that a zeugma is employed to give the word a different meaning when applied to the injury inflicted on the heel.

Some modern translations, such as the English Standard Version, have "offspring" instead of the more literal "seed".

Judaism 
In rabbinical Judaism, the contrasting groups of "seed of the woman" and "seed of the serpent" are generally taken as plural, with the promise "he will bruise your head" applied to Adam and mankind bruising the serpent's head.  There is a Jewish tradition where a messiah is said to be a remedy to the bruising of the heel of the "seed of the woman".  

Although a possible Jewish messianic interpretation of Genesis 3:15 in some schools of Judaism during the Second Temple period has been suggested by some Christian scholars, no evidence of such an interpretation has yet come to light.

Christianity

Christ 
In Christianity, Genesis 3:15 is known as the protevangelium. This is a compound of two Greek words,  meaning "first" and  meaning "good news" or "gospel". Thus, the verse is commonly referred to as the first mention in the Bible of the "good news" of salvation. Old Testament scholar Derek Kidner describes the Protoevangelium as "the first glimmer of the gospel", and Victor P. Hamilton emphasises the importance of the redemptive promise included in the curse.

The reference to the "seed of the woman" is believed by Christians to be a prophecy of the virgin birth of Jesus. They believe that elsewhere in the Bible, a child is referred to as the "seed" of his father, exclusively. In fact, there are other passages when the Hebrew for seed is used for a woman. In Genesis 16:10 an angel says to Hagar, a woman, "I will multiply thy seed exceedingly, that it shall not be numbered for multitude."  Hagar was not a virgin, therefore one cannot conclude that the seed of a woman must refer to a virgin birth.

Jesus is called the "seed of David" at Romans 1:3, and the whole nation of Israel is referred to as the "seed of Jacob" at Jeremiah 33:26. For Jesus to be called the "seed of the woman", therefore, is interpreted to mean that he will have no earthly father. The phrase "seed of the woman" is sometimes counted as referring to Jesus.

Identification of the "seed of the woman" with Jesus goes back at least as far as Irenaeus (180 AD), who (along with several other Church Fathers) regarded this verse as "the first messianic prophecy in the Old Testament". Serapion, the Bishop of Thmuis, wrote the following: 

Among those who follow a Christological interpretation of the verse, the bruising of the serpent's head is taken to refer primarily to the final defeat of Satan, while the bruising of the heel of the seed of the woman is taken to refer to the crucifixion of Christ. Louis Berkhof, for example, wrote: "The death of Christ, who is in a preeminent sense the seed of the woman, will mean the defeat of Satan."

A tradition found in some old eastern Christian sources (including the Kitab al-Magall and the Cave of Treasures) holds that the serpent's head was crushed at Golgotha, described as a skull-shaped hill at the centre of the Earth, where Shem and Melchizedek had placed the body of Adam.

In Romans 16:20, there is perhaps the clearest reference to the Protoevangelium in the New Testament, "And the God of peace shall bruise Satan under your feet shortly. The grace of our Lord Jesus Christ be with you. Amen." Here, the seed of the woman is identified as "the God of peace", and yet the Church is identified as the feet that will bruise Satan's head. Martin Luther, in his Lectures on Romans, also identifies the seed of the woman with "the word of God in the church".

Mary 
Catholics often understand the "woman" of Genesis 3:15 to refer primarily to the Virgin Mary, rather than Eve. The text in Genesis is also seen as connecting to the sign the Lord gives to King Achaz through Isaiah 7:14, "Therefore the Lord himself will give you a sign. Behold, the virgin shall conceive and bear a son, and shall call his name Immanuel." The English Douay–Rheims Bible 1609 onwards has "she shall crush thy head, and thou shalt lie in wait for her heel". This reading was supported in the Bull Ineffabilis Deus of December 1854 and is defended by Anthony Maas in the 1912 Catholic Encyclopedia.Having interpreted the seed of the serpent as a reference to the followers of Satan, Maas also writes:

The Anglican-Roman Catholic International Commission explains the controversy:

Modern Catholic bibles often refrain from using feminine pronouns in this verse.

Many scholars connect Jesus’ usage of the word “woman” to call Mary instead of calling her "mother" as a confirmation of Mary being the "Woman" described in Genesis 3:15. Mary was often seen as the "New Eve," who crushed the serpent's head at the Annunciation by obeying the Angel Gabriel when he said she would bear the Messiah (Luke 1:38).

Notes

References

Citations

Bibliography

 

Bereshit (parashah)
Biblical phrases
Book of Genesis
Christian soteriology
Christian terminology
Christology
Mariology